Rivadavia is a town in eastern Salta Province, Argentina in the Department of Rivadavia,  from the city of Salta. It is in a low-lying region of the province.

Climate 

Rivadavia has a hot semi-arid climate (BSh) according to the Köppen climate classification. Using the Trewartha climate classification the climate is semi-arid with very hot summers and mild winters, being classified as 'BShl'.

Temperature extremes can be very high in the summer especially in early summer before the heaviest and most persistent rain.

References

External links 
 National Institute of Statistics and Censuses

Populated places in Salta Province